The following highways are numbered 44.

Australia
 Great Western Highway, Parramatta Road (Sydney)
 Captain Cook Highway - Queensland State Route 44 (Regional)
 Greensborough Highway

Canada
 Alberta Highway 44
 Manitoba Highway 44
 Ontario Highway 44
 Saskatchewan Highway 44

Germany
  Bundesautobahn 44

Hungary
  Main road 44 (Hungary)

India
  National Highway 44 (India)

Israel
Highway 44 (Israel)

Iran
Road 44

Italy
 State road 44

Japan
 Japan National Route 44
 Kushiro-Sotokan Road

Korea, South
 National Route 44

New Zealand
 New Zealand State Highway 44

Norway
 Norwegian County Road 44

South Africa
R44 (South Africa)

Thailand
  Thailand Route 44

United Arab Emirates
  E 44

United Kingdom
 British A44 (Oxford-Aberystwyth)

United States
 Interstate 44 (Texas–Missouri)
 Interstate 44 (North Carolina–Virginia) (former proposal)
 U.S. Route 44
 Alabama State Route 44
 California State Route 44
 County Route J44 (California)
 Colorado State Highway 44
 Delaware Route 44
 Florida State Road 44
 County Road 44 (Citrus County, Florida)
 County Road 44W (Citrus County, Florida)
 County Road 44 (Lake County, Florida)
 County Road 44B (Lake County, Florida)
 Georgia State Route 44
 Georgia State Route 44 (former)
 Hawaii Route 44
 Idaho State Highway 44
 Illinois Route 44 (former)
 Indiana State Road 44
 Iowa Highway 44
 K-44 (Kansas highway)
 Kentucky Route 44
 Louisiana Highway 44
 Maryland Route 44 (former)
 M-44 (Michigan highway)
 Minnesota State Highway 44
 County Road 44 (Ramsey County, Minnesota)
 Mississippi Highway 44
Missouri Route 44 (former)
 Montana Highway 44
 Nebraska Highway 44
 Nebraska Link 44C
Nebraska Recreation Road 44B
 Nevada State Route 44 (former)
 New Jersey Route 44
 New Jersey Route 44T (former proposal)
 County Route 44 (Bergen County, New Jersey)
 County Route 44 (Monmouth County, New Jersey)
 New Mexico Highway 44 (former)
 New York State Route 44 (former)
 County Route 44 (Broome County, New York)
 County Route 44B (Cayuga County, New York)
 County Route 44 (Chautauqua County, New York)
 County Route 44 (Dutchess County, New York)
 County Route 44 (Erie County, New York)
 County Route 44 (Lewis County, New York)
 County Route 44 (Putnam County, New York)
 County Route 44 (Rensselaer County, New York)
 County Route 44 (Rockland County, New York)
 County Route 44 (Schoharie County, New York)
 County Route 44 (St. Lawrence County, New York)
 County Route 44 (Steuben County, New York)
 County Route 44 (Suffolk County, New York)
 County Route 44 (Warren County, New York)
 County Route 44 (Washington County, New York)
 County Route 44 (Wyoming County, New York)
 North Carolina Highway 44 (former)
 North Dakota Highway 44
 Ohio State Route 44
 Oklahoma State Highway 44
 Pennsylvania Route 44
 South Dakota Highway 44
 Tennessee State Route 44
 Texas State Highway 44
 Texas State Highway Loop 44
 Farm to Market Road 44
 Texas Park Road 44
 Utah State Route 44
 Vermont Route 44
 Virginia State Route 44 (former)
 West Virginia Route 44
 Wisconsin Highway 44

See also
A44 (disambiguation)
List of highways numbered 44A